CIQM-FM is a radio station broadcasting at 97.5 FM in London, Ontario, Canada, branded as 97.5 Virgin Radio. The station airs a CHR/Top 40 format. CIQM is owned by Bell Media. CIQM's studios are located at 1 Communications Road along with CJBX-FM, CJBK, and CFPL-DT while its transmitter is located near Byron in West London.

CIQM operates on a frequency once occupied by CKO from 1977 to 1989.

History 
CIQM originally operated as Q103 at 103.1 FM (now the home of CFHK-FM in St. Thomas) from its sign-on in 1986 until moving to the 97.5 frequency vacated by CKO in 1993. For many years, the station was known as Q97.5, even after taking on the "EZ Rock" trademark; in 2006, the "Q" was dropped and the station became known as simply 97.5, London's EZ Rock.

On September 6, 2010, CIQM underwent several changes, including a tweak in branding (as The New Sound of EZ Rock), a new logo and new on-air staff. The station moved from its 24-year-old adult contemporary format to hot adult contemporary. The switch was due to rival CKOT-FM switching from easy listening to a gold-based soft AC mix, and also because of rimshot rivals CIHR-FM and CHGK-FM, both mainstream AC stations, also being heard in London. The station also dropped the decimal point from the station ID after flipping to Hot AC. Just after the format tweak, Astral Media switched CIQM's jingles to the Hot AC jingles. Despite all of the changes, CIQM, which once dominated the market, suffered from ratings erosion, and had the lowest share in the London CMA, and was a distant second place behind CKOT.

On August 13, 2012, CIQM began stunting with jockless music, as well as their website being replaced by a countdown clock, with a voiceover informing listeners to tune at 8 a.m. on August 17, when an impending "update" of the station would be completed. At that time, the station flipped to CHR/Top 40, becoming the 5th station in Canada (12th overall, including CKQB-FM in Ottawa, although that station reverted to its previous "Bear" branding (and has since flipped to CHR), CKZZ-FM in Vancouver (though they are considered Hot AC, and has since reverted to its former "Z" branding), and CFBT-FM in Vancouver) using the "Virgin Radio" branding. The final song on "EZ Rock" was "Rehab" by Amy Winehouse, while the first song on "Virgin" was "Pound the Alarm" by Nicki Minaj. Longtime rival CFHK-FM became once again the market's only Hot AC station. CIQM-FM's flip to CHR filled the Top 40 void in London for the first time since 2004, when CFHK dropped it in favour of its current Hot AC format.

The station has a full-time air staff and some shows are syndicated from iHeartRadio.

References

External links 
 97.5 Virgin Radio
 
 

Iqm
Iqm
Virgin Radio
Radio stations established in 1986
1986 establishments in Ontario